The  Eastern League season began on approximately April 1 and the regular season ended on approximately September 1. 

The West Haven A's defeated the Lynn Sailors three games to zero to win the Eastern League Championship Series.

Regular season

Standings

Notes:
Green shade indicates that team advanced to the playoffs
Bold indicates that team advanced to ELCS
Italics indicates that team won ELCS

Playoffs

Semi-finals Series
Lynn Sailors defeated Glens Falls White Sox 2 games to 0.

Championship Series
West Haven A's defeated Lynn Sailors 3 games to 0.

Attendance

References

External links
1982 Eastern League Review at thebaseballcube.com

Eastern League seasons
1982 in baseball